The 290th Infantry Division was a German infantry division in World War II. It was formed in the Munster Training Area in Wehrkreis X on 6 February 1940 and surrendered to Soviet forces at the end of the war as part of Army Group Courland.

History

The division participated in Fall Rot as part of Army Group B, and later performed occupation duties in France until February 1941, when it was sent to East Prussia during the buildup prior to Operation Barbarossa. It served in various sectors on the Eastern Front as part of Army Group North, later Army Group Kurland, for the remainder of the war.

In the winter of 1941 the division was trapped in the Demyansk Pocket along with the 12th, 30th, 32nd and 123rd infantry divisions, and the SS-Division Totenkopf, as well as RAD, Police, Todt organization and other auxiliary units, for a total of about 90,000 German troops and around 10,000 auxiliaries. Their commander was General der Infanterie Walter Graf von Brockdorff-Ahlefeldt, commander of the II. Armeekorps (2nd Army Corps).

Commanding officers
Generalleutnant Max Dennerlein (? February – 8 June 1940)
Generalleutnant Theodor Freiherr von Wrede (8 June – 19 September 1940)
General der Infanterie Helge Auleb (19 September – 14 October 1940)
Generalleutnant Theodor Freiherr von Wrede (14 October 1940 – 1 May 1942)
Generalleutnant Conrad-Oskar Heinrichs (1 May 1942 – 1 February 1944)
Generalmajor Gerhard Henke (1 February – ? June 1944)
Generalmajor Rudolf Goltzsch (? June – 18 August 1944)
Generalmajor Hans-Joachim Baurmeister (18 August 1944 – 25 April 1945)
Generalmajor Carl Henke (25 April – 27 April 1945)
Generalleutnant Alfred Hemmann (27 April – 8 May 1945)

Order of battle

1940 

 Infantry Regiment 501
 Infantry Regiment 502
 Infantry Regiment 503
 Artillery Regiment 290
 Divisions Units 290

1944 

 Grenadier Regiment 501
 Grenadier Regiment 502
 Divisions Fusilier Battalion 290
 Artillery Regiment 290
 Divisions Units 290

References
 Tessin, Georg (1974). Verbände und Truppen der deutschen Wehrmacht und Waffen-SS im Zweiten Weltkrieg 1939–1945. Neunter Band. Die Landstreitkräfte 281–370. Biblio-Verlag, Osnabrück. .
 Weg und Schicksal der bespannten 290. I. D. (Schwertdivision). 1940–1945. Chronik in Bildern''. Hrsg. vom Traditions-Verband 290 I.D. Podzun-Pallas-Verlag, Friedberg 1986, .

Infantry divisions of Germany during World War II
Military units and formations established in 1940
Military units and formations disestablished in 1945